Bagayevsky (masculine), Bagayevskaya (feminine), or Bagayevskoye (neuter) may refer to:

Bagayevsky District, a district of Rostov Oblast, Russia
Bagayevskaya, a rural locality (a stanitsa) in Rostov Oblast, Russia